Acleris mundana is a species of moth of the family Tortricidae. It is found in the Russian Far East (Ussuri) and Korea.

References

Moths described in 1979
mundana
Moths of Asia